The Sierra Leone prinia (Schistolais leontica), also known as the white-eyed prinia, is a species of bird in the family Cisticolidae.  It is found in Ivory Coast, Guinea, Liberia, and Sierra Leone.  Its natural habitat is thickets and forest edge, especially in the transition zone between submontane forest and submontane grassland.  It is threatened by habitat loss, especially habitat clearance to establish iron ore mines.

References

Further reading

Sierra Leone prinia
Birds of West Africa
Sierra Leone prinia
Sierra Leone prinia
Taxonomy articles created by Polbot